Tomar is a city in Portugal.

Tomar may also refer to:

Tomar clan, a Rajput, Gurjar and Jat clan
Tomaras of Delhi, a 9th-12th century Indian dynasty
Tomaras of Gwalior, a 14th-16th century Indian dynasty
Tomar Jacob Hileman (1882–1945), American photographer
Tomar wine, a Portuguese wine
Tomar (surname)
Tomrair (died 848), Viking jarl also known as Tomar

See also
Tomar-Re
Tomar-Tu